An elegy is a poem of mourning.

Elegy, Elegie, or Elegies may also refer to:

Art
Élégie, a painting by William-Adolphe Bouguereau

Literature
 Any poem written in elegiac couplets
 Elegies by Propertius (ca. 50-15 BC)
 Elegy, a 1586 poem by Chidiock Tichborne
 "Elegy Written in a Country Churchyard", a 1751 poem by Thomas Gray
 Elegy, the opening poem in Leonard Cohen’s first collection Let Us Compare Mythologies from 1956.

Film and television 
 Elégia, a 1965 film by Hungarian director Zoltán Huszárik
 Elegy (film), a 2008 film by Spanish director Isabel Coixet
"Elegy" (The Twilight Zone), an episode of The Twilight Zone
"Elegy" (The X-Files), an episode of The X-Files

Music

Classical
"Elegy", Russian song by Modest Mussorgsky
Elegy, by Elliott Carter
Elegy (Corigliano), by John Corigliano
Elegy, by Hubert Parry
Elegy, for guitar by Alan Rawsthorne
 Elegia (Madetoja), Op. 4/1, a 1909 composition for string orchestra by Leevi Madetoja
Elegie (Schoeck), Op.36 song cycle for baritone and chamber orchestra by Othmar Schoeck
Élégie (ballet), a ballet by George Balanchine to Igor Stravinsky's Élégie for solo viola
 Élégie (Massenet), an 1873 piece for cello and orchestra
 Élégie (Fauré), an 1883 piece for cello and orchestra
 Elegies (Busoni), a 1908 series of pieces
 Elegy, Op.58, an orchestral work for strings by Edward Elgar
 Élégie (Stravinsky), a 1944 piece for solo viola
 Elegies (William Finn), a 2003 song cycle
Élégie, by Johann Kaspar Mertz
Élégie pour cor et piano, FP 168, by Francis Poulenc
Élégie pour 2 pianos (en accords alternés), FP 175, by Francis Poulenc
 Elegy, by George Thalben-Ball, 1960

Popular bands
 Elegy (band), a Dutch power metal musical group
 Elegies (J-pop), a J-pop musical group

Albums
 Elegy (Julian Lloyd Webber album), a 1998 album
 Elegy (The Nice album), a 1971 album
 Elegy (John Zorn album), a 1991 album
 Elegy (Amorphis album), a 1996 album
 Elegies (video), a 2005 DVD by Machine Head
 Elegy (EP), a 2005 EP by Leaves' Eyes

Songs
 "Elegy", a song by Edge of Sanity from their 1994 album Purgatory Afterglow
 "Elegy", a song by As I Lay Dying from their 2003 album Frail Words Collapse
 "Elegy", a song by Intronaut from the 2010 album Valley of Smoke
 "Elegies", a song by Make Them Suffer from the 2012 album Neverbloom
 "Elegy", a song by Patti Smith from her 1975 album Horses (album)
 "Elegy", a song by Jethro Tull from the 1979 album Stormwatch (album)
 "Élégie", an arrangement of Massenet's Élégie by Art Tatum
 "Elegy", a suite by Chicago from their 1971 album Chicago III